"Just Who is the 5 O'Clock Hero?" is a song and single released by The Jam on 3 July 1982. It features on their sixth studio album The Gift. It made number eight in the UK Singles Chart in July 1982. The single came with two B-sides – a version of "War" and an original Weller song, "The Great Depression".

Song
The song addresses those in 9 to 5 jobs as a nameless factory worker returns home to his wife wanting nothing but to sit and watch television before he has to go back to the 'lunch box and the worker/management rows'. The chorus focuses on the character having lived in the same street for years and highlights the futility of his life: 'as one life finishes the other one starts'- there has to be more to life than 'scrimping and saving and crossing off lists'.
According to interviews with Weller (and the booklet accompanying the Direction Reaction Creation box-set) the point was not to ridicule or criticise the character (as he had Mr. Clean on All Mod Cons) but rather to highlight them as 'real heroes of Britain'.

Live performance
The Jam regularly played the song live on their 'Trans-Global Unity Express' world tour between March and June 1982, where it always segued into a brief cover of Sam Cooke's 1960 single 'Chain Gang'. In late 2012, Paul Weller again began performing the song live (at a much slower pace and without the 'Chain Gang' medley).

References

1982 singles
The Jam songs
Songs written by Paul Weller